Tombos is a  municipality in southeast Minas Gerais state, Brazil. It is located in the Zona da Mata region and its population was approximately 7,850 inhabitants in 2020 (IBGE).

References

Municipalities in Minas Gerais